KBNX (97.9 FM, "97.9 & 103.9 Sunny FM") is a radio station with a classic hits music format owned by William W. McCutchen III. It is licensed to Bangs, Texas.

References

External links

BNX
Radio stations established in 2016
2016 establishments in Texas